Mülheim-Kärlich is a town in the district Mayen-Koblenz, in Rhineland-Palatinate, Germany. It is part of the Verbandsgemeinde ("collective municipality") Weißenthurm. It is situated west of Koblenz, a few km from the Rhine. It is the site of the closed Mülheim-Kärlich Nuclear Power Plant.

Notable people 
 Ludwig Becker (1855–1940), church architect and builder; constructed the new Parish Church of St. Mauritius 1931–1932
 Ludwig Kaas (1881–1952), Chairman of the Centre Party; 1910 chaplain in Kärlich
 Lucas Luhr (1979-), professional racing driver

References

Mayen-Koblenz
Middle Rhine
Districts of the Rhine Province